Yponomeuta internellus is a moth of the family Yponomeutidae. It is found in southern Queensland and in New South Wales.

The wingspan is about 20 mm.

The larvae feed on Cassine australis. They live communally in a silken web on their food plant.

External links
Australian Faunal Directory
Australian Insects

Yponomeutidae